Njuguna S. Ndung'u is a Kenyan economist who is the Minister of Finance in the cabinet of President William Samoei Ruto since October 2022.

Ndung'u previously served as the eighth Governor of the Central Bank of Kenya for two consecutive four-year terms, from March 2007 until March 2015.

Early life and education
Ndung'u was born in Kandara, Murang'a county in Kenya in 1960. He studied economics at the University of Nairobi, earning both a Bachelor of Arts in Economics and a Master of Arts in Economics from the university. His Doctor of Philosophy, also in economics, was obtained from the University of Gothenburg in Sweden.

Career

Career in academia
Before his appointment as Governor of the Central Bank of Kenya, Ndung'u was the director of training at the African Economic Research Consortium (AERC). He lectured in advanced economic theory and econometrics at the University of Nairobi, where he was an associate professor of economics. He also worked as a regional programme specialist for the Eastern and Southern Africa Regional Office, Nairobi, of the International Development Research Centre, Canada; and at the Kenya Institute for Public Policy Research and Analysis as a principal analyst/researcher and head of the Macroeconomic and Economic Modelling Division.

Ndung'u conducted extensive research and teaching work in various fields of economics, including macroeconomics, microeconomics, econometrics, and poverty reduction. He published in international journals as well as chapters in various books on economic policy issues, inflation, interest rate and exchange rate issues, financial management, public sector growth, external debt, financial liberalization in Anglophone Africa, structural adjustment, as well as on employment and labour market issues.

Return to academia
In 2018, Ndung’u re-joined the AERC, this time as executive director. In 2019, he served on the advisory board of the annual Human Development Report of the United Nations Development Programme (UNDP), co-chaired by Thomas Piketty and Tharman Shanmugaratnam.

Other activities
 African Development Bank (AfDB), Ex-Officio Member of the Board of Governors (since 2022)
 East African Development Bank (EADB), Ex-Officio Member of the Governing Council (since 2022)
 International Monetary Fund (IMF), Ex-Officio Member of the Board of Governors (since 2022)
 World Bank, Ex-Officio Member of the Board of Governors (since 2022)

See also
 List of banks in Kenya
 Economy of Kenya
 Kenyan shilling

Succession table

References

External links
 CBK Board Taps New Chairman To Replace Ndung’u
 Website of Central Bank of Kenya

Living people
1960 births
Central Bank of Kenya people
Kikuyu people
21st-century Kenyan economists
Kenyan bankers
Governors of the Central Bank of Kenya
University of Gothenburg alumni
University of Nairobi alumni
20th-century Kenyan economists